The 1960 Florida gubernatorial election was held on November 8, 1960. Democratic nominee C. Farris Bryant defeated Republican nominee George C. Petersen with 59.85% of the vote.

Primary elections
Primary elections were held on May 3, 1960.

Democratic primary

Candidates
C. Farris Bryant, former State Representative
Doyle E. Carlton Jr., State Senator
W. Haydon Burns, Mayor of Jacksonville
John Moore McCarty, State Senator
Fred Dickinson, State Senator
Thomas E. David
Harvie J. Belser, former State Representative, State Representative
Bill Hendrix
George Downs
Jim McCorvey

Results

Republican primary

Candidates
George C. Petersen
Emerson Rupert

Results

General election

Candidates
C. Farris Bryant, Democratic
George C. Petersen, Republican

Results

References

1960
Florida
Gubernatorial
November 1960 events in the United States